Lake Barrea, is an artificial lake in the Province of L'Aquila, Abruzzo, Italy. It is located within the National Park of Abruzzo, Lazio and Molise. The Sangro is its inflow and outflow. To its northwest is Villetta Barrea and to its southeast is Alfedena. To its north is Monte Greco.

References 

Lakes of Abruzzo
Ramsar sites in Italy